Inverness Park is a small unincorporated community in Marin County, California.

Inverness Park is located between the communities of Point Reyes Station and Inverness. The community uses Point Reyes Station's post office. The community's population is counted as part of the Inverness census-designated place.

It stretches for three or four miles (6 km) from Limantour Road, north along Sir Francis Drake Boulevard, hugging the western edge of Tomales Bay. It is immediately adjacent to the Point Reyes National Seashore.

History
Development began in 1909.

The community's original population included many Portuguese and Italian immigrants who worked the land. At least two fish hatcheries existed in the area until about 50 years ago.

Originally a few isolated houses, Inverness Park expanded in the 1950s as a failed developer's pipe dream called Noren Estates. A later, more successful housing expansion in the steep hills called Paradise Ranch Estates more than doubled the population.  A product of David Adams Real Estate, Paradise Ranch Estates sold parcels with views of the Pacific Ocean and Tomales Bay. Paradise Ranch Estates was plagued by problems relating to its roads and availability of water. As the Adams family moved out of ownership, residents assumed the task of road improvement and maintenance. After the floods of January 4, 1982, a municipal water supply was hooked up.

In the fires of October 1995, forty-eight homes on the ridges of Paradise Ranch Estates burned, including that of singer Jesse Colin Young.

References

External links

Populated coastal places in California
Unincorporated communities in California
Unincorporated communities in Marin County, California
West Marin